For the village in Argentina, see Villa Mirasol.

The Villa Mirasol is a historic residential building in Les Sables d'Olonne, Vendée, France.

History
It was built in 1914, and designed by architect Maurice Durand. It was built by Félix Gault on a former cemetery for Léon Herbert, a wealthy landowner.

The ground floor came with a tearoom and a smoking room while the first floor came with a large bedroom looking out to the Atlantic Ocean. The facade was designed by sculptor Maurice Legendre. The main entrance was on the Place du Maréchal Foch, but the maids used the door on the Rue Travot.

The building has been listed as an official historical monument by the French Ministry of Culture since 1975. The facade was restored in 1995.

References

Houses completed in 1914
Buildings and structures in Vendée
Monuments historiques of Pays de la Loire
20th-century architecture in France